The following lists events that happened during 1993 in Singapore.

Incumbents
President: Wee Kim Wee (until 1 September), Ong Teng Cheong (starting 1 September)
Prime Minister: Goh Chok Tong

Events

January
 1 January – Edusave is launched to provide all Singaporeans with quality education. The scheme also institutes awards for academic and non-academic achievements.

February
 11 February – Asia Pacific Economic Cooperation Secretariat is set up in Singapore.
 20 February –
NTUC Comfort announced that it will corporatise to help in its expansion plans. The plan went through, which resulted in the formation of Comfort Transportation Pte Ltd later in June.
The Senoko Incineration Plant is officially opened, making it the third incineration plant in Singapore.
 21 February – The World of Aquarium closes due to bad business, less than two years after it reopened. The building reopens as the Fort Canning Aquarium after a few months.

March
 6 March – St Luke's Hospital starts construction in Bukit Batok, sparking opposition from residents which is eventually solved.

April
 1 April – Medifund is set up to provide for medical treatment when Medisave and Medishield are not able to completely cover medical costs.
 29 April – The first meeting between Association for Relations Across the Taiwan Straits and Straits Exchange Foundation.

May
 May – Shaw House (Lido) is opened to the public.

June
 8 June – Gardenia's new bakery is officially opened.
 12–20 June – Singapore hosts the 17th Southeast Asian Games. It clinched fourth place with a total of 164 medals.

August
 1 August – The National Heritage Board is formed to manage museums and encourage a vibrant cultural and heritage scene.
 5 August – An MRT collision takes place at Clementi station during the morning rush hour, resulting in 156 injuries.
 28 August – Ong Teng Cheong wins the first-ever presidential election by 952,513 votes, with Chua Kim Yeow getting 670,358 votes.

September
 1 September – Ong Teng Cheong is sworn in as the first elected president.
 21 September – Ngee Ann City is officially opened.

October
 3 October – The Great Singapore Workout is launched as part of the National Healthy Lifestyle Campaign, encouraging people to live healthily.
 30 October – The Institute of Mental Health (then called Woodbridge Hospital) is officially opened in Hougang.

November
 1 November – SingTel is listed on the then Stock Exchange of Singapore (present day Singapore Exchange) after an IPO in October.
 9 November – The Special Tactics and Rescue Unit of the Singapore Police Force is commissioned.
 10 November – The Fire Safety Act is passed to ensure safety of buildings in the event of fires.
 27 November – Junction 8 is opened to the public.

December
 5 December – The Jurong section of the Pan Island Expressway opened to traffic.
 17 December – The Ang Mo Kio Community Hospital (present-day Ang Mo Kio - Thye Hua Kwan Hospital) is officially opened. The hospital works with General Practitioners, which will mainly serve the elderly living in the area.

Date unknown
 The National Cancer Centre Singapore starts operations.
 Chinatown Point and Wheelock Place are opened.
 261 O-Level papers are lost in transit.

Births
 8 January – Amanda Lim, national swimmer.
 24 September – Narelle Kheng, The Sam Willows member.
 4 November - Noah Yap, actor.
 10 November – Raeesah Khan, former politician.
 11 December – Boon Hui Lu, singer.

Deaths
 11 January – John Le Cain, first Asian as Singapore Police Force commissioner (b. 1912).
 15 March – Georgette Chen, painter (b. 1906).
 3 June – Yeoh Ghim Seng, Speaker of Parliament (b. 1918).
 5 August – Tay Eng Soon, Senior Minister of State (Education) (b. 1940).
 1 December – John Chia Keng Hock, former footballer (b. 1913).

References

 
Singapore
Years in Singapore